Alan Campbell (born 9 October 1991) is an Irish Gaelic football player who plays at inter-county level for Tipperary, and plays his club football for Moyle Rovers.

Career
He played under-21 football for Tipperary in 2012.
Campbell made his championship debut for Tipperary in 2012 against Kerry 	
On 31 July 2016, he started at full-back as Tipperary defeated Galway in the 2016 All-Ireland Quarter-finals at Croke Park to reach their first All-Ireland semi-final since 1935.
On 21 August 2016, Tipperary were beaten in the semi-final by Mayo on a 2-13 to 0-14 scoreline.

On 22 November 2020, Tipperary won the 2020 Munster Senior Football Championship after a 0-17 to 0-14 win against Cork in the final. It was Tipperary's first Munster title in 85 years.

Tipperary
 National Football League Division 3 (1): 2017
 National Football League Division 4 (1): 2014
Munster Senior Football Championship (1): 2020

References

External links
Tipperary GAA Profile

1991 births
Living people
Moyle Rovers Gaelic footballers
Tipperary inter-county Gaelic footballers
Place of birth missing (living people)